"Weeds" is a song by American alternative metal band Life of Agony. The song was released as the first single from the band's third studio album Soul Searching Sun.

The song is the band's first charting single, reaching no. 27 on the Billboard Mainstream Rock chart and no. 91 on the UK Singles Chart. The b-side "River Runs Red (Re-Zamped)" is a re-recording of the title track from the band's debut album; this version of the song also appeared on certain special editions of Soul Searching Sun. "How It Would Be '97" is a re-recording of "How It Would Be" from Ugly.

Track listing
CD single

7" single

Chart positions

Personnel
Life of Agony
Keith Caputo – vocals
Joey Z. – guitar
Alan Robert – bass
Dan Richardson – drums

References

External links
Official Music Video at YouTube

1997 songs
1997 singles
Roadrunner Records singles
Alternative metal songs
American alternative rock songs